IDFA may refer to:

 International Documentary Film Festival Amsterdam, an annual film festival
 International Dairy Foods Association, host of one half of the Worldwide Food Expo
 Identifier for Advertisers, a unique advertising identifier for Apple devices

See also
Idfa, a village in Egypt